The Wayang Museum is a museum dedicated to Javan wayang puppetry. The museum is located in Kota Tua, Jakarta, Indonesia. It is one of several museums and galleries facing the Fatahillah Square, which include Jakarta History Museum, Fine Art and Ceramic Museum, and Kota Post Office art gallery.

History 

The museum building occupies the site of a church which was built in 1640, under the name of the Old Dutch Church. In 1732, the church was renovated and the name was changed into the New Dutch Church. In 1808, an earthquake destroyed the church. Later in 1912, a building was constructed in the Neo-Renaissance style on the site, which initially functioned as a warehouse belonging to Geo Wehry & Co. In 1938, the building was renovated, following Dutch colonial architecture. The garden of the Wayang Museum, located on the former yard of the Dutch church, was the funeral site of General Governor Jan Pieterszoon Coen.

Later, the building was bought by the Batavia Society of Arts and Sciences, an institution dealing with Indonesian culture and science. The institution then transferred this building to the Old Batavia Foundation and on December 22, 1939, it was made a museum under the name of Old Batavia Museum. In 1957, after the independence of Indonesia, the building was transferred to the Institute of Indonesian Culture and on September 17, 1962, to the Ministry of Education and Culture. On June 23, 1968, the DKI Jakarta Administration made the building into the Wayang Museum; the inauguration took place on August 13, 1975.

Collections 

The museum has a collection of various kinds of wayang, such as the Javanese wayang kulit and Sundanese wayang golek. Inside the museum is the plate marking the tombstone of Jan Pieterszoon Coen. A wayang theater and a workshop of wayang-making are periodically organised in the museum.

References

External links 

Museums in Jakarta
Industrial buildings completed in 1912
Museums established in 1975
Puppet museums
1975 establishments in Indonesia
Colonial architecture in Jakarta
Cultural Properties of Indonesia in Jakarta
West Jakarta
Wayang